Marie Louise Island is a low-lying coral island in the Amirantes group of the Outer Islands of the Republic of Seychelles, in the western Indian Ocean, with a distance of 308 km south-west of Victoria, Seychelles.

History
The Island was named by the Chevalier du Roslan in 1771 after his ship Marie Louise. Since the end of the 19th century, the island has been leased and inhabited without interruption. In 1905, the population numbered 86. There was an export of 3500 tons of guano that year.  Guano had been the main economy until 1963, when still 3000 tons were produced. Additional products were copra and dried fish.

In the 1980s there have been attempts in developing the island into a tourist destination. Some bungalows were constructed. The attempts failed because of air traffic limitations due to the large number of seabirds. Additionally, aircraft landing is difficult, because of the steep coast that is littered with rocks.
In 2012 the government established a new prison on the island.

Geography
Marie Louise Island, with an area of 55.6 ha, is located at the southern end of the Amirantes 13 km from its nearest neighbor, Desnoeufs Island. The island is a low and sandy coral cay, roughly oval in shape, and has a maximum elevation of 9 m.
More than half of the island, in the northwestern part, is cultivated with coconut palms. 
There is a coral reef on the east side of the island which breaks.
Landing by boat is difficult.

Demographics
It is permanently inhabited with a population of about 11. 6 are IDC staff members, 1 is a medic person for the island, and there is one remaining family at the original village. The villagers are agricultural workers and beach fishermen and are based in a small settlement on the north-west coast above the beach and opposite the only safe anchorage. 
There are also 98 inmates in the state prison guarded by 3 Seychelles officers, and 30 gurkha security guards.
With a population of 142 as of February 2015, this made Marie Louise Island the most populated of the Amirantes at that time. However, the prison was closed in 2017.

Administration
The island belongs to Outer Islands District. 
Being an island with a small population, there are not any government buildings or services. For many services, people have to go to Victoria, which is a difficult task.

Transport
The island is bisected by a  unpaved airstrip (ICAO code FSMA) that follows the north–south axis. currently there are no regular air services.

Economics
The inhabitants on the island are engaged in very small scale farming and fishing which are mainly for the island consumption.

Flora and fauna
The vegetation is dominated by coconut-palms and Casuarina equisetifolia trees. It is used as a support base for the harvesting of sooty tern eggs on neighboring Desnoeufs Island during the nesting season from June to August. Marie Louise has been identified as an Important Bird Area (IBA) by BirdLife International because it supports breeding colonies of brown (2000 pairs) and lesser noddies (3500 pairs), and white terns (3000 pairs). Green and hawksbill sea turtles also nest there.
 The island is known for its rich fish life.

Image gallery

References

External links 

 Island guide 1
 Island guide 2
 National Bureau of Statistics
 Info on the island
 2010 Sailing directions

Important Bird Areas of Seychelles
Seabird colonies
Islands of Outer Islands (Seychelles)
Prison islands